Frank William Volk (born November 10, 1965) is a United States district judge of the United States District Court for the Southern District of West Virginia.

Education 

Volk earned his Bachelor of Arts from West Virginia University and his Juris Doctor from the West Virginia University College of Law.

Legal career 

Upon graduating law school, Volk served as a law clerk to Judge Charles Harold Haden II and as a term law clerk to Judge M. Blane Michael of the United States Court of Appeals for the Fourth Circuit. Prior to his appointment to the bench, he served as a career law clerk on the United States District Court for the Southern District of West Virginia, working for both Judges John Thomas Copenhaver Jr. and Charles Harold Haden II. During that time, he was an adjunct professor at the West Virginia University College of Law, where he taught courses on federal civil rights law and bankruptcy for more than a decade.

Federal judicial service

Bankruptcy court service 

Volk served as chief judge of the United States Bankruptcy Court for the Southern District of West Virginia from 2015 to 2019.

District court service 

On April 2, 2019, President Donald Trump announced his intent to nominate Volk to serve as a United States district judge of the United States District Court for the Southern District of West Virginia. On April 4, 2019, his nomination was sent to the Senate. President Trump nominated Volk to the seat vacated by Judge John Thomas Copenhaver Jr., who assumed senior status on November 1, 2018. On May 22, 2019, a hearing on his nomination was held before the Senate Judiciary Committee. On June 20, 2019, his nomination was reported out of committee by a voice vote. On October 16, 2019, the United States Senate invoked cloture on his nomination by a 90–0 vote. His nomination was confirmed later that day by a 92–0 vote. He received his judicial commission on October 17, 2019.

References

External links 

1965 births
Living people
20th-century American lawyers
21st-century American judges
21st-century American lawyers
Judges of the United States bankruptcy courts
Judges of the United States District Court for the Southern District of West Virginia
Lawyers from Morgantown, West Virginia
United States district court judges appointed by Donald Trump
West Virginia University alumni
West Virginia University College of Law alumni
West Virginia University College of Law faculty